Rodrigo José Rodrigues (26 July 1879 - 18 January 1963) was a military physician, colonial administrator and politician who held prominent roles during the First Portuguese Republic. He was Minister of the Interior (1913-1914), Civil Governor of the District of Aveiro and the District of Porto, Governor of Macau (1922-1925) and attaché of the Portuguese legation to the Society of Nations (1925-1927).

Rodrigues was a physician in Cape Verde and Goa and a professor at the Goa Medical School before 1910.

He participated in the Portuguese delegation of the Society of Nations from 1925 to 1927.

References 

 
 
 

1879 births
1963 deaths
20th-century Portuguese politicians
People from Celorico de Basto
Governors of Macau
Portuguese colonial governors and administrators